Selfie is an American television sitcom starring Karen Gillan and John Cho. Created and executive produced by Emily Kapnek for Warner Bros. Television, the series debuted on ABC during the 2014–15 television season. The series premiered on September 30, 2014. The pilot was made available early through video on demand and online streaming media on August 20, 2014.

The show was canceled mid-season by ABC on November 7, 2014. On November 13, after broadcasting the seventh episode, ABC announced that they would pull the remaining episodes of Selfie and replace them with encore episodes of Shark Tank and Thanksgiving/Christmas specials.

On November 25, 2014, the first of the remaining six episodes was released online on Hulu and WatchABC.com. The rest followed on a weekly basis, with the last episode airing on December 30, 2014.

Despite being a short-lived series, critics later showed interest in Selfie as more episodes were released. There were also many supporters for the fan campaign. TV Guide called Selfie the "Best Turnaround" series of the decade.

Premise
The series follows the life of Eliza Dooley, a sales representative at KinderKare Pharmaceuticals. She is obsessed with the idea of achieving fame through the use of social media platforms, including Instagram and Twitter, where she regularly posts selfies. She begins to worry that "friending" people online is not a substitute for real friendship, and she seeks help from co-worker Henry Higgs, a marketing image guru.

The character names are a reference to Eliza Doolittle and Henry Higgins, the main characters of the 1912 George Bernard Shaw play Pygmalion, further popularized by the 1956 musical My Fair Lady. In the play and musical, Henry is tasked with improving Eliza's social status, and ends up falling in love with his own creation. The Shaw play is in turn inspired by a story from Greek mythology, that of Pygmalion, a sculptor who fell in love with a statue he had created. The series featured modern social problems and music.

Cast and characters

Main
 Karen Gillan as Eliza Dooley (based on Eliza Doolittle)
 John Cho as Henry Higgs (based on Henry Higgins)
 Da'Vine Joy Randolph as Charmonique Whitaker
 Allyn Rachel as Bryn, Eliza's nerdy neighbor
 David Harewood as Sam Saperstein, chairman of KinderKare Pharmaceuticals

Recurring
 Giacomo Gianniotti as Freddy (based on Freddy Eynsford-Hill), Eliza's boyfriend and a lawyer at KinderKare Pharmaceuticals
 Allison Miller as Julia Howser, a pediatric urologist that Henry dated
 Samm Levine as Terrence, a KinderKare office floater (later promoted to customer service) who marries Sam's daughter Maureen in the pilot episode, becoming the son-in-law of Sam and Yazmin Saperstein
 Brian Huskey as Larry, a lab technician at  KinderKare Pharmaceuticals
 Matty Cardarople as Charlie, Henry's assistant
 Jennifer Hasty as Joan, fellow KinderKare Pharmaceuticals employee and Saperstein's secretary
 Patty Troisi as Linda, another KinderKare employee
 Nikhil Pai as Raj, KinderKare's new Human Resources employee
 Hayley Marie Norman as Maureen Saperstein, married to Terrence, daughter of Sam and Yazmin Saperstein
 Natasha Henstridge as Yazmin Saperstein, the wife of Sam Saperstein, mother of Maureen and mother-in-law of Terrence
 Kelsey Ford as Prue, Bryn's friend and member of the book club
 Colleen Smith as Wren, Bryn's friend and member of the book club
 Amanda Jane Cooper as Eyelet, Bryn's friend and member of the book club
 Sapir Azulay as Thistle, Bryn's friend and member of the book club
 Keith L. Williams as Kevin, Charmonique's son
 Tim Peper as Ethan, Henry's friend at KinderKare. Ethan appeared in the pilot episode, and was in promotional images with the main cast, but left the show after that

Episodes

Ratings

Release

Broadcast 
Selfie released the pilot episode early on Twitter on August 20, 2014. The show officially premiered on September 30, 2014, Tuesday, at 8:00PM PST on the ABC Network. It was up against competition in the same time slot with NCIS (season 12) on CBS, The Voice (season 7) on NBC, and The Flash on The CW, and Utopia on FOX, which later changed programming to MasterChef Junior (season 2). The first 7 episodes aired on ABC and after its cancellation, the remaining 6 episodes aired on Hulu.

International broadcast 
Warner Channel in Latin America aired Selfie on October 4, 2014. Warner TV Asia in some Southeast Asian countries aired the show on December 3, 2014. The series was also shown in South Africa on Vuzu Amp on January 15, 2015 and later on Vuzu on April 29, 2015. Kanal 5 premiered the series in Sweden on May 22, 2015. It was introduced on RTÉ2, television channel in Ireland on June 15, 2015. On July 6, 2015, the show aired on the ETC channel in the Philippines. In South Asia, Selfie was broadcast in India on November 8, 2015 on Zee Café, a premium channel. The series premiered in Australia on streaming platform Stan in 2015. The series began on TV2 in New Zealand on August 30, 2015. In Poland, the show appeared on Comedy Central Family Poland on August 25, 2016.

Home media 
For a limited time, Selfie streamed on the ABC website and Hulu. It was on Hulu from November 25, 2014 to May 2015 and returned on May 1, 2016 until April 30, 2019. No official DVD or Blu-ray was made. Currently, Warner Brothers have not released the show on any streaming platforms.

Production

Development 
On October 8, 2013, ABC picked up a pilot from creator Emily Kapnek, which was described as a comedy inspired by My Fair Lady. On May 8, 2014, it was ordered to series.

Casting 
It was reported on February 18, 2014 that Karen Gillan would star as Eliza Dooley. On February 24, 2014, Tim Peper and Da’Vine Joy Randolph were cast for the pilot. Allyn Rachel joined the show on February 24, 2014. David Harewood was added to the cast as Sam Saperstein on March 6, 2014. John Cho was announced as the male lead for Henry Higgs on March 13, 2014.

The producers initially intended to cast Henry Higgs as a white Englishman who was several generations older modeling after the original character. The casting process was very extensive. The creator, Emily Kapnek said, "We looked at tons of different actors, and really once we kind of opened our minds and said let’s get off of what we think Henry is supposed to be and just talk about who is, we just need a brilliant actor—and John [Cho]’s name came up." She also mentioned that the ABC network was the first to suggest color-blind casting. Julie Anne Robinson, one of the directors and executive producers who later worked on Bridgerton, revealed in 2021 interviews that she advocated casting Cho and had to persuade "top to bottom of everybody in that chain" that he was the perfect choice for the role, which took a long time to consider. Robinson fought for Cho and won, saying, "That's what I'm most proud of about that whole pilot."

Filming 
Since Karen Gillan was filming Guardians of the Galaxy at the time, she had to shave her head for the role of Nebula and then wear a wig as Eliza on Selfie. In the pilot, she wore a generic wig for most of the first episode,  then later switched to a personal wig that was made from her real hair after the character's makeunder scene and for the rest of the show. Her personal wig was made by the same costume department that worked on Star Wars: The Force Awakens.

In the sixth episode, "Never Block Cookies" written by Brian Rubenstein and aired before the cancellation was announced, the writer described the behind the scenes with Gillan and Cho's characters, Eliza and Henry,  having an intimate moment, which lead to an almost kiss. Rubenstein said that he remembered that moment in particular: “Emily [Kapnek] came down and was sort of orchestrating how that whole thing would go. Just the chemistry between those two was really cool to watch; it felt that way on set.”

Post-airing 
After the show was canceled, a fan campaign was created and the remaining six filmed episodes of Selfie were released on the ABC website and Hulu on November 25, 2014 until May 2015. The series was originally intended to have a full first season with 26 episodes in total. One of the writers, Brian Rubenstein, mentioned to The A.V. Club in 2017, "I know we had a plan for what the next 13 [episodes] was going to be for their story, but I can’t for the life of me think of it right now!"

He also said, "You need time to figure out the show, and come together and fully realize what it is.” The writer continued, “It’s very rare that a comedy is just roaring out of the gate. You need to give things time to find the voice. I can’t speak to the business side of things recovering or ratings growing or whatever that is, but it does suck that we are on such a short leash—and we all do feel it, but at the same time there’s nothing we can do about it.”

Rubenstein was surprised Selfie was still being brought up even long after the show was finished. He recalled being confused at work when a writer’s assistant suddenly asked him several questions about the show. The assistant informed him that the series was on Hulu's front page at the time. Rubenstein remarked, "So that’s really cool that it can live on in that way.” Selfie returned to Hulu on May 1, 2016 with all 13 episodes until April 30, 2019.

Cancellation and fan campaign
Despite reasonable potential for the series, Selfie had problems attracting an audience. Ratings slipped after the first episode to an undesirable 0.9, and remained stagnant through the season. It was also up against long-running shows like NCIS and The Voice in the same time slot. As a result of this, ABC announced that Selfie would be cancelled on November 7, 2014.

Fans began a #SaveSelfie campaign to keep the television show on the air. A fan from Kentucky, Erika Lawson, created a change.org petition for a second season renewal with over 65,000 supporters. In order to bring more awareness to the movement, fans also made fan media, held contests, and fundraised for charity. The fundraiser was created on December 24, 2014 by Clinton Alvord with the support of Lawson and other fans. It was inspired by the show's character, Henry who regularly donates to UNICEF. They raised $1000 for UNICEF on Crowdrise (later acquired by GoFundMe) by January 31, 2015. Another fan, Heather Johnson, retweeted as many #SaveSelfie hashtags as possible, created "Save Selfie" t-shirts and caps, and along with other fans mailed lipsticks to the president of ABC Studios to demonstrate loyalty to the show. She also tweeted a picture of herself with her boyfriend using the same pose as actors on the show depicting a similar relationship as a White-American woman and Asian-American man highlighting that representation in media is important.

The seventh episode of Selfie was aired on November 11, 2014, which would be later realized to be the final aired episode on network television. On that same day, Guy Aoki, founder of Media Action Network for Asian Americans (MANAA), pitched in to help with the cause by contacting ABC President Paul Lee and diversity head Tim McNeal inquiring what could be done to save the show. McNeal said while Lee was a big champion of the sitcom, the rating numbers were not there. When sponsors place ads on a television program, the network guarantees a target number. If it does not reach the audience target number, the network would have to refund the money to the sponsors and end up losing money. The next step would to ask advertisers to be patient to give the series a chance grow, but the ABC network did not give any more opportunities to broadcast the rest of the episodes. The ABC President said, "Unfortunately once we make those decisions it's impossible to go back on them...It was a very difficult decision because it was a very, very good show." However, in the following year he favored and renewed other shows with declining ratings such as Marvel’s Agent Carter, Galavant and American Crime giving them more time to grow their audience instead. Aoki noted that Selfie series trended on Twitter in the Los Angeles area peaking at #5 with 50,000 tweets about the show in a month. Many fans from around the world like the U.S., U.K., Italy, China, Brazil, and Russia expressed their grief over the cancellation.

On November 19, Kapnek tweeted that all remaining episodes of the series would be released online on Hulu, Hulu Plus, and ABC.com, with official confirmation coming a few days later.

While many fans were complacent with news, MANAA was still determined that the studio should try to shop to another network. After Johnson attended a meeting with MANAA, she attempted to contact the Warner Brothers president at the time, Peter Roth, since the show was produced by the same company. However, Roth's secretary hung up on both the fan and Aoki. She also sent an email message to Roth's office, only to receive a message from Selfie's publicist. Aoki followed up and noted while the company was "definitely aware" of the #SaveSelfie movement, they could not reveal if there was any plan to save the series. Since the studio put the episodes for free online, it was determined that they were not interested in shopping to another television network. However, persistent efforts from the fans helped push the online release of the remaining episodes sooner than normally expected, which was about two weeks after the cancellation. Compared to the early cancellation of Manhattan Love Story on ABC, which also aired the same Tuesday night as Selfie, it took over a month for the rest episodes of Manhattan Love Story to be released. And in another case, Don't Trust the B---- in Apartment 23, also previously canceled by the same network, it took about four months to release its remaining episodes after the show left the air.

After the show ended, Selfie continued to have a dedicated following of fans years later.

Reception

Critical response 
Initially, reviews were unfavorable towards the show's pilot episode. Hillary Busis of Entertainment Weekly wrote on October 3, 2014 about the first episode that “There could be a decent show trapped within Selfie … Too bad the show’s cruel sense of humor and reliance on instantly dated references … may very well drive away viewers before they can see what Selfie and Eliza become.” In addition, EW staff criticized the show's flawed portrayal of social media and stated that "technology and social media is integrated far more naturally into the lives of most people." Kevin Fallon of The Daily Beast remarked, "It’s not often that a comedy is both this endearing and repugnant. It’s hard to remember when a sitcom was as relatable and inviting as it is alienating." Brian Lowry of Variety wrote, "There’s much to be said about social media self-obsession in the digital age, but almost nothing memorable about it in this latest spin."

However, later reviews began to show interest in the television show. Eric Francisco from Inverse mentioned, "But a funny thing happened on the way to cancellation: Selfie got better. Cho and Gillan displayed more comfort in their roles — and their chemistry became electric, then downright hot." He pointed out that "it seemed that it took a cancellation for people to realize that Selfie was the first American comedy series to feature an Asian-American romantic male. Busis changed her opinion of the show in a follow-up on EW. Vulture lamented its cancellation. Salon did too, calling Henry and Eliza “the most promising interracial couple on TV.” After picking up the series again on a whim, Busis said that Selfie was "a show that’s firmly on the upswing—and I’m bummed to see it cut down just when it was starting to realize its potential." The New Republic observed, "'Selfie' has quietly turned into one of the funniest, most delightful sitcoms on TV." Francisco stated, "Selfie wasn’t perfect, but it deserved to grow — and Cho deserves another chance at leading a major TV series; it seems as if networks gave him just one chance, while most white actors get shot after shot at a successful show."

Even years after, Selfie is still referenced and praised in articles. The series has been featured on lists about recommended shows or shows cancelled too soon like on Nerdist,  Entertainment Weekly, E!, Thrillist,  USA Today, and Collider. In December 2019, Megan Vick from TV Guide stated, "Selfie remains the best turnaround of the decade, that we started to appreciate too late." In September 2020, Kirby Beaton of BuzzFeed published an article titled "Selfie Was The Millennial Show We All Needed And I Miss It Every Damn Day." In October 2020, Alexis Nedd from Mashable wrote that Selfie would greatly benefit with a different name. The show displayed good comedy, engaging characters, consistent emotional arc, and strong chemistry between the romantic leads. Nedd also noted that it was "one of the first sitcoms to address social media addiction and influencers with nuance and understanding." In August 2021, Elizabeth Logan of Glamour reviewed a romantic comedy film, He's All That, but also brought up Selfie stating its premise was perhaps ahead of its time. Logan remarked, "If the algorithm is listening, I have a suggestion: Netflix, buy up the few episodes of Selfie. Your audience is primed for it." In January 2022, Lyvie Scott of Slash Film commented,  "A 'Selfie' reprisal would have plenty to play with — and it wouldn't hurt to see Gillan and Cho pick up their fantastic rapport once more."

Fandom 
Selfie gained a cult following after its broadcast. When the cancellation was announced, dedicated fans attempted to revive the show by displaying their support on social media with hashtag #SaveSelfie, email messages, phone calls, $1000 donation to UNICEF, and a change.org petition with over 65,000 signatures. However, no other television network picked up the series. Hulu and ABC.com were only able to show the rest of the unaired episodes for a limited time.

After the show ended, several fans throughout the years have given support to Karen Gillan regarding Selfie at conventions and asked what were her thoughts about the possible ending for Eliza and Henry.

In July 2015 at a Nerd HQ event, actor Alan Tudyk recommended Selfie to the audience and highly praised Gillan by saying, "I don't know what goes on with ABC and all the Warner Brothers. I don't know how they decide what stays and what goes, but I feel like if they had given that show a real shot, Karen would have been getting Emmys. I don't know any other comedic actress on television that was delivering such a solid performance week after week after week."

In January 2018, in an interview with John Cho on one of NPR's podcasts, Pop Culture Happy Hour, Linda Holmes said, "People still really miss and talk about Selfie. It goes by on my Twitter feed relatively frequently how much people miss it." Cho replied that he also misses the show. He mentioned that it was very fulfilling for him and that he had such a good time working on the series.

Cho was a guest on the podcast of They Call Us Bruce Lee episode 47 in August 2018. One of the hosts, Phil Yu remarked that fans from all different backgrounds would like to see Cho reprise his role on Selfie. Cho responded that he thought about the idea of having a musical film of Selfie, going back to its roots with My Fair Lady. In a January 2019 Bustle interview, Gillan also supported the thought of making a movie version so that Henry and Eliza's story could have closure.

Gillan commented about the strong fanbase for the short series and how she still gets questions about Selfie. In 2019, Gillan said, "Yes! Oh, my God. It's actually so crazy how much of a lifespan this thing has had considering it was only 13 episodes." She also stated that she would love to work with Cho again on another project.

In an interview with Refinery29 in July 2021, Gillan responded that she still gets constant tweets from fans saying they miss the show. The actress is also open to revisit the show with Cho suggesting a smaller project. She was also informed that she is most known for Selfie on her IMDb page.

Additionally, Selfie had a resurgence in China in 2021-2022 because there were trending videos of the characters, Eliza and Henry, on social media like Douyin, Weibo (3 million views) and Bilibili (1.5 million views). Chinese audiences had positive reactions to the show and mentioned that it was similar to Korean dramas, which are popular internationally. The gradual approach to the romance, chemistry between the leads, and the main character's personal growth were also appreciated by viewers. Fans even used episode scripts as study guides to learn English. Many Chinese fans were sad and disappointed that Selfie did not continue with a second season.

Da'Vine Joy Randolph said in May 2022 that it meant a lot to her and the cast that people still talk about the series eight years later. She also mentioned that she would join a Selfie revival and suggested a movie or limited series.

In July 2022, when asked about Cho's thoughts on the show's cancellation, he answered, "I'm still stunned to see how many people still love that series. And yeah, I was bummed when it got canceled. I just thought that was a good show." In January 2023, Cho mentioned he did not receive much offers for romantic comedy roles since Selfie.

Awards and nominations 
Selfie was nominated for the "Favorite New TV Comedy" People's Choice Award for 2014.

References

External links
 
 

2010s American romantic comedy television series
2010s American single-camera sitcoms
2014 American television series debuts
2014 American television series endings
American Broadcasting Company original programming
English-language television shows
Television series about social media
Television series based on plays
Television series by Warner Bros. Television Studios
Television series created by Emily Kapnek
Television shows set in Los Angeles
Asian-American television